Lietzau is a German surname. Notable people with the surname include:

Hans Lietzau (1913–1991), German theatre director, actor, and producer
William K. Lietzau, American lawyer

German-language surnames